The 2016 WAC men's soccer tournament, was the 9th edition of the tournament. It determined the Western Athletic Conference's automatic berth into the 2016 NCAA Division I Men's Soccer Championship.

UNLV won the WAC title, making it their second WAC championship. The Rebels defeated Air Force in the championship, 2–1.

Seeding 

The top six programs qualified for the WAC Tournament. Grand Canyon and Incarnate Word were ineligible for the tournament due to their transition from Division II to Division I soccer. Grand Canyon finished fifth in the regular season table, allowing seventh-place, Cal State Bakersfield to qualify.

Bracket

Awards

References 

tournament 2016
Western Athletic Conference Men's Soccer
2016